A Prize of Gold is a 1953 thriller novel by the British writer Max Catto.

Film adaptation
In 1955 it was adapted into a film of the same title directed by Mark Robson and starring Richard Widmark, Mai Zetterling and Nigel Patrick.

References

Bibliography
 Goble, Alan. The Complete Index to Literary Sources in Film. Walter de Gruyter, 1999.

1953 British novels
British novels adapted into films
British thriller novels
Novels by Max Catto
Heinemann (publisher) books